Lawrence Hesterfer  (June 9, 1878 – September 22, 1943) was a Major League Baseball pitcher who played in  with the New York Giants.

Born in Newark, New Jersey, Hersterfer was a life-long resident of neighboring Bloomfield, New Jersey.

He is the only player known to have hit into a triple play in his first major league at bat. Facing the Pittsburgh Pirates, Hesterfer came to bat with the bases loaded and no outs. The triple play was a sharp line drive grabbed by the shortstop, Honus Wagner, for the first out; he stepped on second base for the second out and threw to first to complete the triple play.

References

External links

1878 births
1943 deaths
Major League Baseball pitchers
New York Giants (NL) players
Baseball players from Newark, New Jersey
Newark Colts players
Newark Sailors players
People from Bloomfield, New Jersey
Toronto Maple Leafs (International League) players
Buffalo Bisons (minor league) players